Marshall Henry "Tip" Tyler (June 12, 1873 – December 16, 1942) was the head coach of the Rhode Island Rams football team in the early 20th century. He compiled a 25–22–10 record. He was first hired in 1898 as headmaster of the two-year preparatory high school program of the college. This preparatory school was continued for ten years until 1908, when Tyler moved on to chair the college's Mathematics Department. He was mathematics professor at the college until his death on December 16, 1942. Tyler Hall on the University of Rhode Island campus in Kingston was named in his honor.

Head coaching record

References

External links
 

1873 births
1942 deaths
19th-century players of American football
Amherst Mammoths football players
Rhode Island Rams football coaches
University of Rhode Island faculty
People from Stafford, Connecticut